The 1958 Illinois Fighting Illini football team was an American football team that represented the University of Illinois during the 1958 Big Ten Conference football season. In their 17th year under head coach Ray Eliot, the Illini compiled a 4–5 record and finished in sixth place in the Big Ten Conference. Center Gene Cherney was selected as the team's most valuable player.

Schedule

References

Illinois
Illinois Fighting Illini football seasons
Illinois Fighting Illini football